NH 116 may refer to:

 National Highway 116 (India)
 New Hampshire Route 116, United States